The historic Los Angeles Stock Exchange Building, also called the Pacific Stock Exchange Building, is located in the Spring Street Financial District within the Historic Core in Los Angeles. It was the headquarters of the Los Angeles Stock Exchange and the Pacific Stock Exchange  from 1931 to 1986. It was then the site of two nightclubs.

The building was designated a Los Angeles Historic-Cultural Monument  on January 3, 1979, and its façade is protected by the Los Angeles Conservancy.

History

The building

Three bas-reliefs entitled Research and Discovery, Production and Finance were designed by Salvatore Cartaino Scarpitta to portray the societal benefit of the stock exchange business, using symbols like the bear and bull that reflect the fall and rising markets in Finance. It also reflects the importance of labor and science, a supportive role to the world of finance. The three works of art represent the roles of individuals, steelworkers at a factory for Production, research chemists in Research and Discovery, and financiers and a woman on a throne in Finance.

Julian Ellsworth Garnsey designed the interior with Native American and Near East styles. The trading floor were 64 booths and a balcony under a  ceiling, which was decorated with sculptured figures. A figure with scales exemplifies Equality and one contemplating the universe represents Permanence. Two other figures were Mercury, which embodies Speed, and an archer for Accuracy. It was built with an auditorium, lecture room, and statistics department on the fifth floor. The next three floors above that are for offices. Floors ten and eleven were built with a library, club, billiard room, reading rooms, and a card room.

Stock exchanges and nightclubs
This Los Angeles Stock Exchange building opened in 1931 and the company merged into the Pacific Coast Stock Exchange in 1956. It was incorporated as the Pacific Stock Exchange in 1973. It was the largest regional stock exchange west of the Mississippi.

In 1986, the exchange moved to another site. By the end of the decade, the Stock Exchange, a nightclub, opened in the renovated building. In 1988, the building was sold by the San Francisco Stock and Bond Exchange to William Dixon, John Wright, and the Empire Group for $2 million. At the time, the Pacific Stock Exchange leased office space in the building and had a trading floor in another location in Los Angeles. 

In 2006, PAX America bought the building. It was renovated again for the nightclub ExchangeLA, which opened in 2010. Aside from the renovations, the building also had to be brought up to code, like work on the fire sprinkler system. The renovations and improvements cost about $5 million and took about two years to complete. The former trading floor was used for the venue, but the rest of the building does not appear to have been occupied. PAX America defaulted on settlements to reimburse the company that operated ExchangeLA for the cost of mandated improvements. Unpaid by PAX, the company filed for bankruptcy in 2013.

In popular culture
 It has been featured in the filming of commercials, television shows, and the movies The Social Network and The Big Lebowski.

See also
List of Los Angeles Historic-Cultural Monuments in Downtown Los Angeles
Los Angeles Board of Trade Building

Notes

References

Buildings and structures in Downtown Los Angeles
Headquarters in the United States
Skyscrapers in Los Angeles
1931 establishments in California